Ashraful Hossen Alom (born 20 January 1985), best known as Hero Alom, is a Bangladeshi model, actor, producer, singer and politician. He is not a member of Bangladesh film industry, though he works as an independent artist who shares videos in social platform. His YouTube channel has over 1.5 million subscribers.

He is mostly known for his absurdist music videos which shows him dancing with random women, which he has become a target of online trolling and the subject of memes in Bangladesh and other South Asian countries. A Hindi play based on Alom, directed by NSD-graduate Mahesh Ruprao Ghodeswar, was staged in 2019, in Ahmedabad and Mumbai.

Early life and career 

Earlier in his life,Alom used to sell Chanachur in a station.Later Alom had been employed selling CDs and later started a satellite TV connection business. He began making music videos as a hobby. Some of his music videos went viral in 2015, and Alom became a popular target of online trolling and a popular subject of memes in Bangladesh. As of December 2018, Alom has acted in one feature film.

Personal life 
Alom currently lives in Erulia, near Bogra, with his wife, Sadia Akter Sumi, and their children, Aalo and Kabir.

Filmography

Short films

Political activities 
In 2018 Alom decided to contest in 2018 Bangladeshi general election and he bought his candidature form for Bogra-4 constituency buying a Jatiya Party (E) nomination paper ahead of the 11th national elections, but Jatiya Party denied him nomination. Later, he sought his candidacy as an independent candidate. On 10 December High Court instructed Bangladesh Election Commission to accept his candidature form as the latter authority denied his candidature earlier and Alom contested in the election as an independent candidate. His candidacy drew so much media attention that, in 2018, he became the 2nd Bangladeshi only behind Khaleda Zia to be in the top 10 in the category of people in 2018 google search trend in Bangladesh. Eventually he lost in the election getting only 638 votes in his name and BNP candidate Mosharraf Hossain won the seat of that constituency.

He contested again in the bypolls to both Bogra-6 and Bogra-4 as an independent, and lost Bogra-4 by only 834 votes.

Charity
Alom is heavily involved in charity works and he founded “Hero Alom Foundation” which support free education for orphans and provides free ambulance, shelter and expenses for homeless people.

Legal issues 
He was arrested in March 2019 for allegedly assaulting his wife for dowry. Alom had earlier assaulted her when she had protested against his “second marriage”, according to Sumi. Alom came home to Erulia village on the outskirts of the town on Monday night after two months and spoke to a woman on mobile phone for three hours, his wife said. According Sumi's father Saiful Alam, he rescued Sumi from Alom’s home on Tuesday night and took her to the hospital. In the police complaint, he alleged Alom also demanded Tk 200,000 in dowry from him.

He was arrested again on August 6, 2022 by Dhaka Police for exploiting and degrading old classical Bengali songs. He said, "The police picked me up at 6 am and kept me there for eight hours. They asked me why I sing Rabindra and Nazrul songs". He was mainly arrested for making a music video from Rabindranath Tagore's song changing its original tone and lyrics. In response, Dhaka's chief detective Harun-or-Rashid said Alom was arrested for wearing the police uniform in his videos without proper permission. The chief detective added that they had also received several complaints against Alom for his take on old classical songs. "We received many complaints against him. (He) totally changed the (traditional) style (of singing)... He assured us that he won’t repeat this", he said.

References 

Living people
Bangladeshi male models
People from Bogra District
Bangladeshi YouTubers
1985 births